Cedius spinosus is a species of ant-loving beetle in the family Staphylinidae. It is found in North America.

References

Further reading

 
 
 
 
 
 
 

Pselaphitae
Beetles described in 1849